Inbar Lavi (born October 27, 1986) is an actress. She is known for portraying Raviva on the 2012 MTV series Underemployed, Vee on the 2014 Fox television series Gang Related, and Sheba on the Fox series Prison Break. Lavi starred in the 2017–2018 Bravo television series Imposters, and played Eve in the final three seasons of the Netflix series Lucifer.

Early life
Lavi was born and raised in Ramat Gan, Israel to a Jewish family from Holon. Lavi's mother has Moroccan origins while her father is of Polish descent. As a child, she suffered from asthma and had to use a nebulizer for 45 minutes at a time. During that time, she watched movies, and "fell in love with cinema". One of her early inspirations was the performance of Israeli-American actress Natalie Portman in Léon: The Professional. Another of her role models was Israeli actress Ayelet Zurer.

Lavi studied ballet and modern dance at the Kiryat Sharet high school in Holon, Israel. She then studied acting at the Sophie Moskowitz School of Acting in Tel Aviv, Israel.

Career

In 2004, at the age of 17, Lavi moved to New York City, where she performed in various off-Broadway productions. After eight months, she moved to Los Angeles, after being accepted with a full scholarship to the Lee Strasberg Theatre and Film Institute. Among her earliest English-speaking roles was Cordelia in a 2006 production of King Lear, starring and directed by Tom Badal.

Starting in 2009, Lavi began making guest appearances on television shows including Entourage, The Closer, Ghost Whisperer, Criminal Minds, CSI: Miami and In Plain Sight. She has also appeared in films including  Tales of an Ancient Empire (2010), Street Kings 2: Motor City (2011) and House of Dust (2013).

Lavi starred in the 2012 MTV television series Underemployed as Raviva, a pregnant, aspiring singer. She portrayed Veronica "Vee" Dotsen in the 2014 Fox television series Gang Related. She appeared in the seventh season of Sons of Anarchy as street prostitute Winsome.

In 2015 Lavi was cast in the lead role in the Bravo television series Imposters (originally titled My So Called Wife), playing "a Machiavellian con-artist and master of disguise"; the series premiered in February 2017. She was cast in the recurring role of Ravit Bivas, a highly trained Israeli soldier, on the second season of the TNT naval drama The Last Ship in summer 2015. In 2016 Lavi joined the Prison Break revival in the role of Sheba, a Yemeni activist. She joined the cast of Lucifer for the series' fourth season, playing Eve, the first woman made and mother to Cain and Abel.

Personal life
She married Israeli boyfriend Dan Bar Shira in Israel in August 2021. They reside together in Los Angeles.

Filmography

Film

Television

References

External links

 

1986 births
Israeli expatriate actresses in the United States
Israeli film actresses
Israeli stage actresses
Israeli television actresses
Living people
People from Ramat Gan
Jewish Israeli actresses
Israeli people of Polish-Jewish descent
Israeli people of Moroccan-Jewish descent